Elsie Comanche Allen (September 22, 1899 – December 31, 1990) was a Native American Pomo basket weaver from the Cloverdale Rancheria of Pomo Indians of California in Northern California, significant as for historically categorizing and teaching Californian Indian basket patterns and techniques and sustaining traditional Pomo basketry as an art form.

Background
Elsie Comanche Allen was born on September 22, 1899, near Santa Rosa, California. Her parents, George and Annie Comanche (Comanche is an Anglicized version of the Pomo name, Gomachu), were wage laborers, who worked on farms owned by non-Native Americans, a job that was common for Pomo people in the early twentieth century. Her father died when she was eight. Soon after, her mother remarried and moved the family to Hopland.

Elsie's first language was Pomo. This was the only language she spoke until she was 13, when she began learning English at an Indian boarding school in Covelo, California. She attend the Indian boarding school for less than  year and then opted to attend a day school in which she felt more comfortable attending- it was here that Elsie became proficient in speaking English during her early teen years. In addition to living in Covelo and Hopland, Elsie lived in several Pomo communities, including Cloverdale, where she was raised by her grandmother, and Pinoleville Rancherias. She also lived briefly in San Francisco at the age of 18, where she found housekeeping and hospital work jobs, and it was in San Francisco that Elsie met her husband, Arthur Allen.

Elsie married Arthur Allen, a northern Pomo man who was half Pomo and half English, in 1919, and between the years of 1920 and 1928, the couple had four children together, Genevieve, Leonard, Dorothy, and George.

Activism 
In addition to being a skilled basketweaver, Allen made it a point to be active in her community. While balancing work and raising her children, Elsie was active in several Pomo and Hintil women's clubs, in which organizations aimed to improve the social and economic environment of Pomo communities. As a female chief of her community, Elsie made it a point to promote education, cultural preservation, and Native rights in the community. Because of her efforts, she was regarding as a cultural scholar by her community and was deemed "Pomo Sage" was granted an honorary Doctor of Divinity degree.

She also made it a point to direct her efforts in ensuring Pomo students had education funding. In addition to her activism regarding social, economic, and cultural advancements, Allen also organized fund-raisers and aided in the establishment of scholarships for Pomo students.

Allen was once involved in a desegregation case regarding non-Native-owned businesses that would not allow Pomos and whites to sit together.

Basketry

The Pomo people traditionally lived in the area around the Russian River in California- including Sonoma, Mendocino, and Lake counties. This area has an abundance of willows, sedges, and other plants that are traditionally used for basketweaving.

Elsie came from a family of accomplished basketweavers, including her mother, Annie Ramon Gomachu Burke (1876–1962) and her maternal grandmother, Mary Arnold (1845–1925), both of Cloverdale Rancheria. Elsie's mother, Annie founded the Pomo Indian Women's Club, which promotes the tribe's basketry. She also convinced Elsie to break with tradition and not burn or bury her baskets – instead to keep them for future basketmakers.

Although she learned to weave as a child, Allen was only able to weave full-time at the age of 62, when her children were all grown. During the 1950s and 1960s, interest in basketry among Pomo had waned, so Allen began teaching anyone interested in learning her technique, which created controversy in her tribe. She taught at the Mendocino Art Center to both Natives and non-Natives as a means of preserving the art of basketweaving and the tradition associated with it. Late in her career, Elsie Allen began using commercial materials in her baskets after receiving a vision. One of her last students was her niece, Susan Billy.

Southern Pomo language

Allen worked with linguist Abraham M. Halpern to document the Southern Pomo language.

Legacy
Allen died on December 31, 1990, at the age of 91.

Together with Mabel McKay and Laura Somersal, Elsie Allen is regarded as one of the three best-known California basketweavers of her generation. Allen is the subject of several books, including Dot Brovarney, Susan Billy, and Suzanne Abel-Vidor's 2005 Remember Your Relations: Elsie Allen Baskets, Family, And Friends and Sandra J. Metzler's 1996 A promise kept: Basketry of the Pomo and the Elsie Allen basket collection.

Elsie Allen High School in Santa Rosa, California, is named for her.

Published work
 Allen, Elsie. Pomo Basketmaking: A Supreme Art for the Weaver. Red. ed. Happy Camp, California: Naturegraph Publishers, Inc. (1972).

See also

 Native American basket weavers
 Native American art

Notes

References
 Dalrymple, Larry. Indian Basketmakers of California and the Great Basin. Santa Fe: Museum of New Mexico Press, 2000. .
 Wycliffe, Lydia L. Woven Worlds: Basketry from the Clark Field Collection at the Philbrook Museum of Art. Tulsa, OK: Philbrook Museum of Art, 2001. .

External links
 Elsie Allen Exhibit at the Oakland Museum of California
 Elsie Allen (1899-1990) Pomo Basket Family
 Elsie Allen on californiabaskets.com

Native American basket weavers
1899 births
1990 deaths
Pomo people
People from Cloverdale, California
Native American writers
20th-century American women artists
Native Americans in California
Native American women artists
Women basketweavers
20th-century Native Americans
20th-century Native American women